Universal was YFriday's fourth album. It was released on 31 March 2006 at Youth for Christ's IXth Hour event in Newcastle.

Track listing
 "Universal" – 3:32 (Ken Riley)
 "I'm Yours" – 4:23 (Ken Riley)
 "Wonderful" – 3:35 (Ken Riley)
 "Lullaby" – 4:33 (Ken Riley)
 "Calling" – 4:09 (Ken Riley)
 "Gravity" – 5:23 (Ken Riley)
 "Shadow of the Cross" – 4:14 (Ken Riley)
 "Everlasting God" – 4:32 (Brenton Brown/Ken Riley)
 "One Hope" – 3:31 (Ken Riley)
 "Yahweh" – 3:55 (Ken Riley)
 "Hallelujah" – 4:10 (Ken Riley)

Personnel
 Ken Riley - vocals and guitars
 Gav Richards - keyboards and backing vocals
 Danny Smith - bass and backing vocals
 Dez Minto - drums

2006 albums
Survivor Records albums
YFriday albums